The International Mountain Bicycling Association (IMBA) is a non-profit educational association whose mission is to create, enhance and preserve trail opportunities for mountain bikers worldwide.

IMBA was formed in 1988, when five California-based mountain bike clubs created an alliance to fight widespread trail closures. The founding clubs were the Concerned Off Road Bicyclists Association, Bicycle Trails Council of the East Bay, Bicycle Trails Council of Marin, Sacramento Rough Riders and Responsible Organized Mountain Pedalers. Gibson Anderson, of Sacramento, was elected IMBA's first executive director.

In 1993 IMBA hired Tim Blumenthal, a former IMBA board member and cycling journalist, as its executive director. When Blumenthal began,  the organization had roughly 1,200 individual members and about 60 affiliated clubs. The headquarters moved to Boulder, Colorado, in 1994.

In the late 1990s, IMBA's membership grew in Canada, Europe and Australia. An international summit was held in Switzerland in 1997. Educational outreach programs such as the Trail Care Crews – traveling trailbuilding schools sponsored by Subaru car corporation – helped expand IMBA's reach. At the end of 1999, IMBA had more than 28,000 individual members, 14 staffers and a budget of $1.2 million.

In 2006, IMBA's membership grew to 32,000 members, with more than 600 affiliated clubs and patrols and a staff of 26. International programs, including IMBA Canada, are continuing to grow. In the US, IMBA has established partnership agreements with most major federal land management agencies, and is widely recognized as a leading source of information for trail-based recreation.

Trail support and maintenance
The IMBA strives to promote mountain biking, trail building, and trail maintenance in a way that enhances the local community, and in a way that considers and minimizes the ecological impact to the environment. The IMBA has developed a set of principles known as the "Rules of the Trail" which promotes responsible and courteous conduct on shared-use and singletrack trails.

Affiliated organizations
Australia
Mountain Bike Australia
Europe
Italy
Germany
Netherlands
Spain
United Kingdom
North America
Canada
Association pour le Développement des Sentiers de Vélo de Montagne au Québec
Mexico
United States
Bicycle Trails Council of Marin
Bicycle Trails Council of the East Bay
Cincinnati Off-Road Alliance
Jersey Off Road Bicycle Association
Michigan Mountain Biking Association
Minnesota Off-Road Cyclists
Monterey Off Road Cycling Association
Mountain Trails Foundation
Northwest Trail Alliance (formerly Portland United Mountain Pedalers)
Responsible Organized Mountain Pedalers
Southern Nevada Mountain Bike Association
Southern Off-Road Bicycle Association
SouthWest Association of Mountain Bike Pedalers (SWAMP)
Valley Mountain Bikers
South America
Argentina

Ride Centers
IMBA has created a "Ride Center" designation whereby IMBA recognizes and rates sites that feature extensive trail networks. IMBA staff selects candidates for "IMBA Ride Center" recognition on an invitation-only basis.  Ride Centers are the organization's strongest endorsement of a trail experience.  As of December 2013, the following is a list of IMBA Ride Centers. 
 Park City, Utah (Gold level)
 Bike Taupo, Taupo, New Zealand (Silver level)
 Oakridge Area, Oregon (Silver level)
 Sun Valley, Idaho (Silver level)
 Copper Harbor, Michigan (Silver level)
 Central Savannah River Area/Forks Area Trail System (FATS) (Bronze level)
 Hot Springs, Arkansas (Bronze level)
 Cuyuna Lakes, Minnesota (Bronze level)
 Harrisonburg, Virginia (Bronze level)
 Helena, Montana (Bronze level)
 Mt. Buller, Victoria, Australia (Bronze level)
 Santos, Florida (Bronze level)
 Singltrek pod Smrkem, Czech Republic/Poland (Bronze level)
Snowshoe Highlands, West Virginia (Bronze Level)
 Redlands, California (Bronze level)

On July 9, 2013, Virginia Governor Bob McDonnell announced that a Richmond Region Ride Center would open in 2014 in the Richmond, Virginia metro region as the first legacy project of the Richmond 2015 Bike Race.

World Summit

Each year IMBA has a bike race showcasing different trail systems all across the world. Some locations have included Steamboat Springs (2014) and Bentonville, Arkansas (2016).

See also
 Mountain Biking
 Single track (mountain biking)

References

External links

CNN: Idaho tops states on IMBA report card
Outside Magazine August 1999 Hey You!, Get Off of My Trail!
Summit Daily News: IMBA to visit Breckenridge
Rocky Mountain News: Mountain bikes might be possible in national parks

International non-profit organizations
Non-profit organizations based in Colorado
Cycling organizations in the United States
Mountain biking teams and clubs in the United States
Mountain biking